Pelagia ( early 4th century), distinguished as Pelagia of Tarsus and Pelagia the Martyr (Pelagía ē Mártys), was a legendary Christian saint and martyr who lived in Tarsus in Cilicia (southeastern Asia Minor) during the reign of Roman emperor Diocletian.  Originally, her feast day was celebrated on October 8, in common with SS Pelagia the Virgin & Pelagia the Harlot, both of Antioch and one or both of whom her story is probably modeled after.

Legend
According to tradition, Diocletian's son, the heir to the throne, fell in love with her and wanted to marry Pelagia. She replied that she could not, because she had sworn to preserve her virginity and was wedded to Christ. In his sorrow, Diocletian's son committed suicide. Pelagia was sent to Rome by her pagan mother, where Diocletian asked her to become his wife. She refused, calling the emperor insane. She was then burnt to death, and her flesh melted and smells of myrrh pervaded throughout Rome. By some versions, she was burned within a brazen bull. The story concludes by relating that the pagans sent four lions to surround her bones, but instead they protected her bones from vultures and crows until a Christian bishop could recover them.

History
There is little historical base to the story, as Diocletian had a daughter Valeria but no sons—a fact of considerable importance to the history of his reign. However, he did carry out the last intensive persecution of Christians in Roman history, many of whose victims were indeed burned alive. Thus, Pelagia might have been an actually martyr of that time, even if under different circumstances than those recounted in the later story. More probably, commemorations of the historical martyr Pelagia at Tarsus were probably embellished and given a local setting at some point.

Constantine the Great built a church on the reputed site of her remains.

See also
 Other saints Pelagia

References

Citations

Bibliography
 

4th-century Christian martyrs
Year of birth missing
People from Tarsus, Mersin
Late Ancient Christian female saints
4th-century Roman women
Executed ancient Roman women
Christians martyred during the reign of Diocletian